Zanjeer: The Chain is a 1998 Bollywood action film directed by Shibu Mitra starring Aditya Pancholi, Pratibha Sinha and Shakti Kapoor in the lead role.

Plot
The film follows the story of Kumar (Aditya Pancholi), a local underworld don of Mumbai, who has a rival Lala Sarweshwar (Kiran Kumar). Both men have occupied their own areas in Mumbai and are running their own businesses. Kumar wants to avenge the death of his father, who had been Lala's loyal friend but Lala got him murdered on doubts of traitory. Kumar has a younger brother Sudhakar (Samrat Mukerji), who hates him because of his criminal activities, unbeknownst to the fact that Kumar committed his first murder to protect Sudhakar.

Cast
Aditya Pancholi as Kumar
Manek Bedi as Ajay
Samrat Mukerji as Sudhakar
Pratibha Sinha as Saroj
Sakshi Shivanand as Kavita
Kiran Kumar as Lala Sarweshwar
Shakti Kapoor
Tej Sapru as Black Cap
Virendra Razdan
Akashdeep

Soundtrack

References

External links
 

1998 films
1990s Hindi-language films
Films directed by Shibu Mitra
Films scored by Anand–Milind